The Nomads are a large organised Maori criminal gang based in Wellington, New Zealand.

History
The Nomads were originally members of the Black Power, known as the "Black Power Nomads", before a large portion of the gang split and formed their own gang in 1977.

In 1997, tensions heated up with the Highway 61 gang and resulted in the murder of Nomad Malcom Munns.

In 2009, Nomads founder and President Dennis Hines died. He is the brother of senior Head Hunters member, William Hines.
He was imprisoned on a count of nearly 100 criminal convictions.

The gang had 103 members in prison in 2013.

Paul Rodgers (Porky Rimene) is the Nomad gang boss.

Notable members

Dennis Hines - founder and long serving President, died in 2009.
Malcom Munns - murdered by the Highway 61 gang.
Paul Rodgers (Porky Rimene) - jailed in 2012 for 15 years for supplying methamphetamine.
Ji (Rex) Daley - Jailed in 2006 and 2020 for violent offending.

See also 
Gangs in New Zealand

References

Gangs in New Zealand
Outlaw motorcycle clubs
Motorcycle clubs in New Zealand